Tim Mannek (born 21 May 1997) is a German footballer who plays as a forward for SC Paderborn II.

References

External links
 

1997 births
Living people
Association football forwards
German footballers
SC Paderborn 07 players
3. Liga players